The Statute Law Revision Act 1875 (38 & 39 Vict c 66) is an Act of the Parliament of the United Kingdom. The Bill for this Act was the Statute Law Revision Bill.

This Act was partly in force in Great Britain at the end of 2010.

The enactments which were repealed (whether for the whole or any part of the United Kingdom) by this Act were repealed so far as they extended to the Isle of Man on 25 July 1991.

This Act was retained for the Republic of Ireland by section 2(2)(a) of, and Part 4 of Schedule 1 to, the Statute Law Revision Act 2007.

This Act was amended by sections 2 and 3 of the Statute Law Revision Act 1878 (41 & 42 Vict c 79).

Section 3 of this Act provided that section 25 of the 9 Geo 4 c 58, which had been repealed by the Statute Law Revision Act 1873, was revived, as from the repeal thereof, and that all proceedings taken thereunder since that repeal were as valid and effectual as if that section had not been repealed.

Sections 2 and 3 of, and the Schedule to, this Act, were repealed by section 1 of, and Schedule 1 to, the Statute Law Revision Act 1894 (57 & 58 Vict c 56).

As to repeals by this Act, see Campbell v Cochrane and Clarke v Bradlaugh. As to omission of parts of the Naval Discipline Act 1866 (29 & 30 Vict c 109) repealed by this Act from copies of that Act, see section 7(2) of the Naval Discipline Act 1884 (47 & 48 Vict c 39).

See also
Statute Law Revision Act

References
"The Statute Law Revision Act, 1875". Halsbury's Statutes of England. Second Edition. Butterworth & Co (Publishers) Ltd. Bell Yard, Temple Bar, London. 1950. Volume 24. Page 195.
"The Statute Law Revision Act, 1875". Chitty's Statutes of Practical Utility. Sixth Edition. Sweet and Maxwell. Stevens and Sons. London. 1911. Volume 1. Title "Act of Parliament". Pages 5 and 6.
John Mounteney Lely. "Statute Law Revision Act, 1875". The Statutes of Practical Utility. (Chitty's Statutes). Fifth Edition. Sweet and Maxwell. Stevens and Sons. London. 1894. Volume 1. Title "Act of Parliament". Pages 5 and 6. 
John Mounteney Lely. Chitty's Collection of Statutes of Practical Utility. Fourth Edition. Henry Sweet. Stevens and Sons. Chancery Lane, London. 1880. Volume 1. Title "Act of Parliament". Pages 6 and 7.
William Paterson (ed). "Statute Law Revision Act". The Practical Statutes of the Session 1875. Printed by Horace Cox. Wellington Street, Strand, London. 1875. Pages 506 to 543.
"The Statute Law Revision Act 1875 (Imp.)". Reprinted Statutes of New Zealand. 1979. Volume 30. Page 161.
The Public General Statutes passed in the thirty-eight & thirty-ninth years of the reign of Her Majesty Queen Victoria, 1875. Queen's Printer. East Harding Street, London. 1875. Pages 593 et seq.

External links
List of amendments and repeals in the Republic of Ireland from the Irish Statute Book.
The Statute Law Revision Act 1875, as applicable to New Zealand, from the Parliamentary Counsel Office.

United Kingdom Acts of Parliament 1875